State Highway 25 (SH 25) is a State Highway in Kerala, India that starts in Mettupalayam and ends in SH 26 . The highway is 14.2 km long.

The Route Map 
Mettupalayam junction, Tattamangalam- Chittur - Nattukal junction (joins Nattukal - Velamthavalam Highway)SH 26

See also 
 Roads in Kerala
 List of State Highways in Kerala

References 

State Highways in Kerala
Roads in Palakkad district